Saint-Mathieu-de-Beloeil (Gilles Beaudet) Aerodrome, Gilles-Beaudet Airport or Aéroport Gilles-Beaudet,  and is located  northwest of Saint-Mathieu-de-Beloeil, Quebec, Canada.

See also
 List of airports in the Montreal area

References

External links
 Page about this airport on COPA's Places to Fly airport directory

Registered aerodromes in Montérégie
La Vallée-du-Richelieu Regional County Municipality